My Financial Career is a 1962 Oscar-nominated animated short directed by Gerald Potterton and produced by Colin Low and Tom Daly for the National Film Board of Canada.

The cartoon is based on a story of the same name from one of Stephen Leacock's collections of short stories, Literary Lapses (1910). It takes a humorous look at a young man's attempt to open a bank account.

Awards
 Golden Gate International Film Festival, San Francisco: First Prize, Animated Film, 1962
 American Film and Video Festival, New York: Blue Ribbon, Literature in Films, 1964
 36th Academy Awards, Los Angeles: Nominee, Best Short Subject, Cartoons, 1963

References

External links

Watch My Financial Career at NFB.ca

1962 films
National Film Board of Canada animated short films
Films based on short fiction
Films directed by Gerald Potterton
Canadian comedy short films
1960s animated short films
1962 animated films
Films produced by Tom Daly
Films produced by Colin Low (filmmaker)
1960s Canadian films